Miandasht or Miyandasht or Mian Dasht may refer to:
 Buin va Miandasht, a city in Isfahan Province, Iran
 Mian Dasht, Bushehr, a village in Bushehr Province, Iran
 Mian Dasht, Mazandaran, a village in Mazandaran Province, Iran
 Mian Dasht, Razavi Khorasan, a village in Razavi Khorasan Province, Iran
 Miyandasht Rural District (disambiguation), various places in Iran